Jogeswar Doley is an Asom Gana Parishad politician from Assam. He was elected in Assam Legislative Assembly by-election in 2000 from Majuli constituency.

References 

Asom Gana Parishad politicians
Assam MLAs 1996–2001
People from Majuli district
Year of birth missing
Possibly living people